Juan Carlos Anangonó Campos (born March 29, 1989) is an Ecuadorian footballer currently playing for Cumbayá.

References

External links
 

1989 births
Living people
People from Ibarra, Ecuador
Ecuadorian footballers
C.D. El Nacional footballers
Mushuc Runa S.C. footballers
C.D. Universidad Católica del Ecuador footballers
S.D. Aucas footballers
C.D. Técnico Universitario footballers
Ecuadorian Serie A players
Footballers at the 2011 Pan American Games
Ecuadorian expatriate footballers
Expatriate footballers in Argentina
Association football defenders
Pan American Games competitors for Ecuador